The Army Game is a 1961 French black-and-white comedy about induction and basic training of army conscripts, co-directed by François Truffaut and Claude de Givray.

It recorded admissions of 1,290,967 in France.

Plot
The upper-class Jean, amiable but not very bright, is called up to do his military service. Adrift in this strange world, he finds a helpful fellow-recruit in his family's worldly-wise chauffeur Joseph. But nothing can save him from his mental and physical ineptitude, which infuriates his instructors, amuses his fellow-soldiers and humiliates him. The bright light in his existence is Catherine, the colonel's charming daughter, after whom he yearns. Things look up for him when the barracks puts on the play Tire-au-flanc, in which Joseph has the part of the incompetent young aristocrat while he plays the wily servant. His success in the role impresses everybody and Catherine is happy to go out with the new hero.

Cast 
  Christian de Tillière  as Jean Lerat de la Grinotière 
  Ricet Barrier as  Joseph Vidauban
 Jacques Balutin  as  Corporal Bourrache 
 Pierre Maguelon  as Petit Bobo
 Serge Korber  as  Un troupier
  Pierre Fabre   as  Un troupier
 Jean-Marie Rivière as  Un troupier
 Cabu  as  Un troupier
 Jean-François Adam  as  Un troupier 
 Jean-Claude Brialy  as  Capitain 
 Bernadette Lafont  as herself
 Pierre Étaix

Production
Based on a stage play, the story had been filmed by Jean Renoir in 1928 and also by Fernand Rivers in 1950. For its third outing on celluloid, the makers adopted a knowingly light-hearted approach to the material, re-using old visual and verbal gags and inserting humorous homages to earlier works such as Vigo's À propos de Nice and Zinneman's Oklahoma!. There were also cameos for André Mouëzy-Éon, who wrote the original play, for François Truffaut, one of the two directors, and for two stars he used in his films, Bernadette Lafont and Jean-Claude Brialy.

References

External links

1961 films
French black-and-white films
French comedy films
French films based on plays
1961 comedy films
1960s French-language films
1960s French films